Castle Avenue cricket ground, also known as Clontarf Cricket Club ground, is a cricket facility in the suburb of Clontarf, Dublin, Ireland.  It is the primary of the two grounds of Clontarf Cricket Club, the secondary being at Mount Temple Comprehensive School, and the lands on which it lies are also home to two rugby union pitches belonging to Clontarf FC.  The ground is one of only three One Day International grounds on the island of Ireland.

Location and capacity
The ground lies on a lane off Castle Avenue in central Clontarf, near Clontarf Castle, and have been home to Clontarf Cricket Club since 1896.  The 50th anniversary of the first game played on the current cricket field was celebrated in 2008. It has a capacity of 3,200 spectators. The playing field's ends are named "Killester" and "City".

History
Clontarf Cricket Club began operations on a site on Vernon Avenue in 1876.  They moved to a site near the end of Howth Road in 1892, which they started to share with rugby union side Clontarf Football Club.  The two clubs moved to the site off Castle Avenue in 1896.  Operations were suspended from 1914 to 1918, and during World War II, the site was used for allotments.  Fully separate playing areas were set out from 1947, and the two clubs swapped fields in 1958, from which time the current playing areas date.

International cricket
Clontarf is one of three One Day International (ODI) grounds in Ireland (the others being Stormont in Belfast and Malahide in Dublin),  hosting its first ODI match on 21 May 1999 as part of the 1999 Cricket World Cup when Bangladesh played the West Indies. Ireland played their first ODI at that venue in July 2007 against the West Indies as part of a quadrangular series.

It was selected as a venue to host matches in the 2015 ICC World Twenty20 Qualifier tournament.

In May 2017, the venue hosted its first match between two Full Member teams when Bangladesh played New Zealand in the 2017 Ireland Tri-Nation Series.

Other sports
There are also two rugby union pitches within the complex, which is home to both cricket and rugby, with Clontarf FC, since 1896.  The clubs swapped sides of the complex (fields) in 1958.

Records

International centuries

ODI Centuries
Eight ODI centuries have been scored at the venue.

International five-wicket hauls

Five-wicket hauls have been taken on the ground on four occasions, all of them in ODIs.

Notes

References

External links
 
 Cricket Europe profile
 Clontarf RFC profile
 Clontarf C.C. website

Cricket grounds in the Republic of Ireland
Clontarf FC
Sports venues in Dublin (city)
Sports venues completed in 1958
Cricket grounds in County Dublin
1999 Cricket World Cup stadiums